The Lutsch House is a historic monument located in the Grand Square of Sibiu, Transylvania, Romania. It uses the code name 143469.91 in the National Archaeological Repertory of Romania.

The building hosts the headquarters of the Democratic Forum of Germans in Romania (FDGR/DFDR), as well as the headquarters of UDMR/RMDSZ Sibiu.

History 

At the end of the 15th century, the house belonged to the Altemberger family, then between 1537–1593 to the Haller family. After 1593 it was in the possession of Johann Lutsch, after whom it was named.
In 1661 the owner became Georg Reussner, his descendants donating the building to the city's property in 1821.
Radical transformations took place in 1830, when the building received its current appearance.

Architecture 

The building has a rectangular plan, it has one floor and a basement. It has two facades facing the Great Square and the General Magheru Street.

The house's current architecture is Baroque. Before renovation in 1830, the building also had Gothic features.

Gallery

See also 
Eyes of Sibiu

References 

Historic monuments in Sibiu County
Buildings and structures in Sibiu